Aleksander Bychowiec of Mogiła was a Russian-Polish noble and an amateur historian of the Russian Empire from the Grodno Governorate.

He is best known as the discoverer (and the name-sake) of the so-called Bychowiec Chronicle, a set of 16th-century texts related to the history of the Grand Duchy of Lithuania.

Family
 Casimir
 Stanislaw Joseph Daniel (1829-1883), a Major General of the Russian Imperial Army

References

People from Pruzhany District
Year of birth missing
1863 deaths
19th-century Polish nobility
Belarusian nobility
19th-century Polish historians
Polish male non-fiction writers
Belarusian male writers
Historians of Lithuania
Male non-fiction writers